Springbett is a surname. Notable people with the surname include:

David Springbett (born 1938), British philatelist
Jay Dee Springbett (1975–2011), British-Australian record executive

See also
Springett